Cnemidophorus duellmani is a species of teiid lizard endemic to Panama.

References

duellmani
Reptiles described in 2013
Taxa named by James Randall McCranie
Taxa named by Stephen Blair Hedges
Reptiles of Panama